"I Know There's Something Going On" is a song recorded in 1982 by ABBA singer Anni-Frid Lyngstad (Frida). It was the lead single from her solo album Something's Going On. The song was a hit around the world during 1982 and 1983.

Song history
Recording began in ABBA's Polar Music Studio, Stockholm, in February 1982. Frida recorded the album during the last year of ABBA in the 20th century. At the time of recording this song/album, Frida wanted to distance herself from "the typical ABBA pop sound". "I Know There's Something Going On" was written by Russ Ballard and produced by Genesis drummer and singer Phil Collins, who also played drums on the song. The backing vocals are sung by Lyngstad herself and Collins.

"I Know There's Something Going On" was released in the summer of 1982 and became a major success for Frida. It hit #1 in Flemish Belgium and Switzerland, and was a Top 10 hit throughout most of Europe, as well as in Australia and South Africa. The song reached #13 on the Billboard Hot 100 in March 1983, where it had a total chart run of 29 weeks.  Though the song did not reach the top ten, Billboard's Year-End chart ranked it as the 20th most popular song of 1983. However, in the UK, traditionally a popular market for ABBA, the song failed to reach the Top 40, peaking at #43 (and spending seven weeks inside the Top 75).

A one-hour TV documentary about the making of the album and this song is included in Frida - The DVD. The whole recording process, from day one in the studio to the release party, was filmed by Swedish TV SVT. This documentary includes interviews with Lyngstad and Collins, Björn and Benny from ABBA, as well as all the musicians involved with the album.

Music video
The music video was directed by Stuart Orme and filmed at several locations in London, England in early July 1982. The video, which received heavy promotion on MTV due to the worldwide success of the song, shows Frida in a relationship with a man who works as a photographer. She then discovers through photos taken at a shoot that the photographer lover is seeing another woman who had modeled for him. The rest of the video consists of Frida spying on the two.

Credits
 Frida – vocals
 Phil Collins – drums, backing vocals, producer
 Daryl Stuermer – guitars
 Mo Foster – bass
 Peter Robinson – keyboards

Charts

Weekly charts

Year-end charts

Cover versions

Bomfunk MC's version

In 2002, Finnish hip hop group Bomfunk MC's used the song as a basis for their track "(Crack It) Something Going On", originally included on The Official Album of the 2002 FIFA World Cup. This version features Swedish singer Jessica Folcker performing the choruses and includes addition writing from Bomfunk MC's members Jaakko Salovaara (music) and Raymond Ebanks (lyrics). "Something Goin' On" was released a single and charted throughout mainland Europe, entering the top 10 in Finland, Germany, Norway, and Sweden. A music video was made for the song, directed by Juuso "Uzi" Syrjä.

Track listings
Scandinavian CD single
 "(Crack It) Something Going On" – 3:47
 "PamPam" – 4:20

European maxi-CD single
 "(Crack It) Something Going On" (original) – 3:47
 "(Crack It) Something Going On" (Beats'n'Styles remix) – 4:45
 "(Crack It) Something Going On" (extended) – 4:52
 "PamPam" – 4:20
 "Live Your Life" (video) – 3:53

Credits and personnel
Credits are taken from the European maxi-CD single liner notes.

Studio
 Mixed at 16 Inch Studios (Helsinki, Finland)

Personnel
 Russ Ballard – music, lyrics
 Jaakko Salovaara – music
 Raymond Ebanks – lyrics, vocals (as B.O.W.)
 Jessica Folcker – vocals
 DJ Gismo – turntables
 JS16 – programming, production, mixing
 Edgar Tompson – mixing
 Jani Tolin – artwork design
 Matti Pyykkö – photography

Charts

Weekly charts

Year-end charts

Certifications

|}

Other covers
 In 1992, Italian disco band Co.Ro. covered the song and released it as a single.
 In 1998, N'Time Vs Larry N'Mike - "What's Going On", rap version of "I Know There's Something Going On"
 In 2006, American electronic rock band Luxxury covered the song on their debut album Rock and Roll is Evil.
 In 2006, Tre Lux Covered the song on their Cover Album "A Strange Gathering".
 In 2007, German band Wild Frontier covered the song for their album Bite The Bullet.
 In 2009, American electronic group Sleepthief covered the song, featuring vocals by Roberta Carter-Harrison.
 In 2011, Swedish heavy metal group Overdrive covered the song for their album Angelmaker.
 In 2014, American Producer Straight-P covered the song featuring Elan Noelle on lead vocals.
 In 2015, Norwegian DJ and producer Hans-Peter Lindstrøm released his own remix of the song.
 In 2016, Norwegian heavy metal singer Jørn Lande and his solo band Jorn recorded their version of the song as the opening number of their cover album Heavy Rock Radio.
 In 2017, American Darwave, EBM, industrial band Sun Goes Dark covered song and released it as a single. Song is also in their album Pieces of humanity, released in 2018.

Sampling
 In 1988, American hip hop trio Salt-N-Pepa sampled the guitar riff in the song "I Gotcha" on their second album A Salt with a Deadly Pepa.
 The drum line of Foo Fighters' "Erase/Replace" from their 2007 album Echoes, Silence, Patience and Grace was borrowed from this song.
 In 2009, the track was sampled by Canadian hip hop artist k-os for the song "Eye Know Something" from his album Yes!.

References

1982 singles
1982 songs
2002 singles
Anni-Frid Lyngstad songs
Bomfunk MC's songs
FIFA World Cup songs
Number-one singles in Belgium
Number-one singles in Switzerland
Song recordings produced by Phil Collins
Songs written by Russ Ballard